Mount Beleyar is a small hill located in Glazovsky District of Udmurtia, Russia. It is 227.1 metres (745 ft) in elevation. Part of the Krasnogorskaya hill chain.

Mount Beleyar is located to the north-west of the village Udmurtskie Klyuchi. Stream Kypkashir flows to the north of the mountain.

Links 
 Map O39-069 // Russian army maps

Hills of Russia
Landforms of Udmurtia